Mapanas, officially the Municipality of Mapanas, is a 5th class municipality in the province of Northern Samar, Philippines. According to the 2020 census, it has a population of 14,234 people.

Geography

Barangays
Mapanas is politically subdivided into 13 barangays.
Burgos
Jubasan
Magsaysay
Magtaon
Del Norte (Poblacion)
Del Sur (Poblacion)
Quezon
San Jose
Siljagon
Naparasan
E. Laodenio (Poblacion)
Manaybanay (Poblacion)
Santa Potenciana (Poblacion)

Climate

Demographics

Economy

References

External links
 [ Philippine Standard Geographic Code]
 Philippine Census Information
 Local Governance Performance Management System

Municipalities of Northern Samar